Elosuchus is an extinct genus of neosuchian crocodyliform that lived during the Middle Cretaceous of what is now Africa (Niger, Morocco and Algeria).

Description and taxonomy
Elosuchus had an elongated snout like a gharial and was probably a fully aquatic animal. The type species, E. cherifiensis from Algeria and Morocco, was originally described as a species of Thoracosaurus by Lavocat, but was recognized as a genus separate from Thoracosaurus by de Broin in 2002. Elosuchus felixi, described from the Echkar Formation of Niger, was renamed Fortignathus in 2016 and is either a dyrosaurid relative or a non-hyposaurine dyrosaurid.

Phylogeny
 
de Broin (2002) created the family Elosuchidae to contain Elosuchus and the genus Stolokrosuchus from Niger. However, recent phylogenetic analyses usually find Stolokrosuchus to be one of the basalmost neosuchian, only distantly related to Elosuchus. Some analyses find a monophyletic Pholidosauridae that includes Elosuchus, while other analyses find Elosuchus to nest with taxa like Sarcosuchus in a clade as a sister-taxon to the node Dyrosauridae+Pholidosauridae.

References

Late Cretaceous crocodylomorphs of Africa
Fossil taxa described in 2002
Prehistoric pseudosuchian genera
Prehistoric marine crocodylomorphs
Fossils of Algeria
Fossils of Morocco
Neosuchians
Cenomanian genera